Flying Daggers is a 2003 Taiwanese-Chinese television series adapted from Gu Long's novel Feidao Youjian Feidao of the Xiaoli Feidao Series. The series is produced by Young Pei-pei and starred Julian Cheung, Ruby Lin and Dong Jie.

Plot
Li Huai is the illegitimate son of Li Manqing, an influential government official who is also well versed in martial arts. His grandfather, Li Xunhuan, was a highly revered martial artist who rose to fame for his signature dagger-throwing technique, the "Little Li Flying Dagger". Li Huai has never met his father before because he was raised far away from home by his mother, who died when he was still a child. He leads the life of a roaming street urchin with his two best friends, Zhao Chuan and Zhang Zhen.

Li Huai eventually meets his father and his family in town, but their reunion is an unhappy one. Li has never been properly educated since he was a child so he behaves in a rough and uncouth manner. His stepbrother and stepmother, who already despise him for his background, find his behaviour disgraceful to their family. Faced with constant prejudice and bullying from his stepbrother and stepmother, Li has no choice but to flee from home. Before he leaves, his father passes him the manual of the "Little Li Flying Dagger" and tells him to practise the skill on his own. His mother left him with an embroidered purse containing a treasure map before she died. Li finds the treasure and roams the jianghu to help the poor with his wealth and use his newly mastered martial arts to uphold justice.

Throughout his adventures, Li gets entangled in romantic relationships with two maidens. The first, Xue Caiyue, is an enemy of his family because his father killed her father, Xue Qingbi, in a duel several years ago. The second, Fang Keke, is indebted to him and has a crush on him because he changed her life from that of a beggar to a rich girl. At the same time, Li's two childhood friends also play significant roles in shaping his path: Zhao Chuan is kind and compassionate towards him, but he is secretly in love with Fang Keke; Zhang Zhen is scheming and ungrateful, and he exploits Li to achieve his goal of becoming the richest man in town.

Cast
 Julian Cheung as Li Huai
 Ruby Lin as Xue Caiyue
 Dong Jie as  Fang Keke
 Sun Xing as Xue Qingbi
 Gao Hongxian as Zhao Chuan
 Zheng Guolin as Zhang Zhen
 Kou Zhenhai as Li Manqing
 Cecilia Han as Leng Xiaoxing
 Yue Yueli as Fang Tianhao
 Liu Weihua as Han Jun
 Li Xueqing as Emperor

See also
 The Sentimental Swordsman
 The Romantic Swordsman (1978 TV series)
 The Romantic Swordsman (1995 TV series)

External links
 

Taiwanese wuxia television series
Chinese wuxia television series
2000s Taiwanese television series
2003 Chinese television series debuts
2003 Taiwanese television series debuts
2003 Chinese television series endings
2003 Taiwanese television series endings
Works based on Xiaoli Feidao (novel series)
Mandarin-language television shows
Television shows based on works by Gu Long